Siraj Khel or Saraj Khel is a village and Union Council of Karak District in Khyber Pakhtunkhwa  province of  Pakistan.Named after Siraj Baba , It is located at 33°1'14N 71°7'3E with an altitude of 710 metres (2332 feet).

References

Populated places in Karak District
Karak District